Potomac Mills is a shopping mall located in Woodbridge, Virginia, in the Washington, D.C., metropolitan area. The first mall developed by the Mills Corporation, it was acquired in 2007 by Simon Property Group.

Simon claims it to be the largest outlet mall in Virginia. It has also been claimed to be the top tourist attraction in Virginia, but the commonwealth tourism board ranked it as tenth in 2004.

Layout
The mall has over 225 retailers and an 18-screen AMC movie theater organized into five "neighborhoods."  Major tenants include Nordstrom Rack, Saks Fifth Avenue OFF 5TH, Costco, Burlington, Marshalls & HomeGoods, Buy Buy Baby, AndThat!, JCPenney, American Freight, TJ Maxx, Bloomingdales Outlet, AMC Potomac Mills 18, The Children's Place, Nike Factory Outlet, Forever 21, Camille La Vie, H&M, ZavaZone, Five Below, IKEA, and Round 1 Bowling & Amusement.

History 
Real estate developer Herbert S. Miller and his Western Development Corporation developed Potomac Mills as a prototype for a shopping center which would combine elements of a regional mall with discount retail. Originally called "Washington Outlet Mall" during planning stages, it was not planned to be enclosed until the last minute.

The 130 acres selected for construction was mostly farmland and woods, although it included several homes and businesses. The Prince William Board of Supervisors approved the first of several rezonings for the mall on February 21, 1984, after a fight over the proposed -tall,  illuminated sign.

The first phase of the mall opened September 19, 1985. The next phase, completed in 1986, added another  of retail space and the movie theater.

The third phase, completed in 1993, added  of value-retail space. anchored by Marshalls and JCPenney Outlet Store, along with a Burlington Coat Factory. Cohoes Fashions was also an early tenant and later closed in 1987, being replaced by a Woodward & Lothrop outlet store. Other original tenants included IKEA, Sears Outlet and Waccamaw Pottery. The IKEA location at Potomac Mills was one of the company's earliest retail outlets in America, and proved so popular that it eventually required a new, dedicated building adjacent to the primary Potomac Mills complex.

The sign was damaged by high winds in 2011, and again in February 2018. The second incident bent and stressed its steel support poles, causing it to tilt precariously over Interstate 95, and forced the sign's dismantling. Near the end of March 2019 a new sign was unveiled, featuring an updated design.

References

External links

Buildings and structures in Prince William County, Virginia
Shopping malls in Virginia
Simon Property Group
Outlet malls in the United States
Tourist attractions in Prince William County, Virginia
Shopping malls established in 1985
1985 establishments in Virginia
Shopping malls in the Washington metropolitan area
Woodbridge, Virginia